Alisa Sergeyevna Tishchenko (born 17 February 2004) is a Russian group rhythmic gymnast. She is the silver medalist and group Olympic runner-up at the Tokyo 2020 Olympic Games, along with Anastasia Bliznyuk, Anastasia Maksimova, Angelina Shkatova and Anastasia Tatareva. She is the 2019 World Junior Group All-Around, Team, 5 Hoops and 5 Ribbons champion and the 2019 European Junior Group All-Around, Team, 5 Hoops and 5 Ribbons champion.

Career

Junior 
Alisa was born in Surgut on 17 February 2004. Her mother encouraged her to begin training rhythmic gymnastics at age 6. In 2017, she moved to Moscow and was invited to train with junior national team. She was a member of Russian Group that competed at the 2019 World Junior Championships in Moscow, Russia taking the gold medal scoring a total of (49.550) ahead of Italy (45.100) and Belarus (43.100) in the all-around competition. They also won gold medals in team competition and in both apparatus finals.

Senior 
In 2020, Alisa was added to Russian National Reserve Team as a senior group gymnast. Reserve group took part in Grand Prix Tartu in February. Alisa and her teammates placed second in Group All-Around competition after Uzbekistan and took gold medals in both Apparatus Finals. In October, Russian Federation organized 2nd Online Tournament in rhythmic gymnastics, where reserve group won in Group All-Around competition (69.050) in front of Uzbekistan. In 2021, Alisa was admitted to compete in the 2021 Moscow Grand Prix, as a member of the official Russian group, where Russia placed first in the All round ahead of Belarus. On July 5, 2021, the Russian Federation announced that Alisa Tishchenko was selected to represent Russia at the 2020 Olympic Games in Tokyo, Japan, (leaving out Karina Metelkova and Olya Karaseva) as a member of the Russian group formed by Anastasia Tatareva, Anastasia Bliznyuk, Anastasia Maksimova and Angelina Shkatova, and that the Russian group will compete in the Moscow 2021 World Challenge Cup on July 9-11. In the Moscow Cup, the Russian group took gold in all aspects ahead of Japan and all possible golds in the apparatus finals ahead of Uzbekistan. From August 7-8, the Russian group competed in the 2020 Olympic Games where they achieved the silver medal in the general competition behind Bulgaria, and it is the first time in 25 years that Russia  has lost the first place and the gold medal in the Olympic Games. From October 29-31, Alisa competed in the 2021 Rhythmic Gymnastics World Championships, in Kitakyushu, Japan, along with the ensemble formed by Anastasia Bliznyuk, Maria Tolkacheva, Polina Orlova and Angelina Shkatova, where the Russian ensemble won gold in the entire contest, for the fifth time in a row, ahead of Italy and Belarus. They also won team gold (along with singles Dina and Arina Averina), gold in the 5-ball final and silver (behind Italy) in the mixed final.

Detailed Olympic results

References

External links 
 

Russian rhythmic gymnasts
2004 births
Living people
Sportspeople from Krasnodar
Medalists at the Junior World Rhythmic Gymnastics Championships
Gymnasts at the 2020 Summer Olympics
Olympic gymnasts of Russia
Medalists at the 2020 Summer Olympics
Olympic medalists in gymnastics
Olympic silver medalists for the Russian Olympic Committee athletes